Rosemberg Pabón Pabón (born January 1, 1947) is a Colombian political scientist who served as the Director of the National Administrative Department of Solidary Economy (DanSocial). A former leader of the M-19 guerrilla movement, he commanded the 1980 Dominican Embassy siege in Bogotá. After the Government reached a peace deal with the M-19, Pabón returned to the country, re-entered society and entered politics, first as a Delegate to the National Constituent Assembly in 1991, then as Mayor of Yumbo from 1998 to 2000, and as Senator for Congress in 2003 and 2004.

Involvement with the M-19

Siege of the Dominican Embassy

Exile in Cuba and demobilization
Pabón lived in exile in Cuba, after the siege, remaining a member of the M-19. He returned to Colombia in 1984, and participated in the siege of the city of Yumbo. He returned to civilian life after M-19 signed a peace treaty with the Colombian government in March 1990.

Political career

Mayor of Yumbo
In 1997, Pabón successfully ran for Mayor of the Municipality of Yumbo as a M-19 candidate for the 1998-2000 period. His first concern as Mayor was to dissipate the public sector strike that had taken place under the administration of the previous mayor Carlos Alberto Moreno Herrera.

In 2000, Rosemberg resigned as Mayor of Yumbo to stand for as a candidate in the nearby elections for Mayor of Santiago de Cali. He temporarily stepped down leaving Abraham Rubio Quiroga as interim Mayor of Yumbo before the next elections, and was finally replaced by Alba Leticia Chávez Jiménez. His run for Mayor of Cali, however, proved unsuccessful, losing to John Maro Rodríguez Flórez.

His administration was criticized for misuse of the public coffers, leaving a COP$5,200 million of deficit and impeding the pay of thousands of public sector employees.

Senator
In 2002, Pabón ran for the Senate of Colombia as third in line from the Alternative Way Senate list of Antonio Navarro Wolff, another former M-19 member, however Navarro's list only managed to get enough votes for two seats. In 2004, Pabón replaced Navarro in the Senate from July 20 to November 1, an opportunity that repeated itself again from July 22 to October 22, 2003 when he replaced Gerardo Antonio Jumi Tapias.

During his time as Senator, Pabón voted in favor of proposed legislation that would have legalized recognition of same-sex unions in Colombia, however the proposed law that had the backing of prominent liberal senators like Piedad Córdoba could not amount the necessary votes to pass.

In 2005, Pabón left the Independent Democratic Pole, a left leaning coalition party which he himself had help found, among other reasons, Pabón was a strong supporter of the conservative leaning President Álvaro Uribe Vélez and believed that the Pole was taking "leftist radicalism of the maoist and procuban era." In 2006, Pabón once again ran for Senate this time trying to align himself more to the centre-right by joining the ranks of the political party Citizens' Convergence, this time around however proved more unsuccessful than before as Pabón was not able to get enough conservative votes and alienated his strong liberal base.

Director of DanSocial
On August 1, 2006, President Uribe named Pabón to head the National Administrative Department of Solidarity Economy, also known as DanSocial., the state agency in charge of formulating and developing policy on matters of solidarity economy. The agency was dissolved November 2, 2011.

Works

References

1947 births
Living people
People from Valle del Cauca Department
19th of April Movement members
Colombian political scientists
Citizens' Convergence politicians
Alternative Way politicians
Independent Democratic Pole politicians
Members of the Senate of Colombia
Members of the Chamber of Representatives of Colombia
Mayors of places in Colombia
Colombian expatriates in Cuba
20th-century Colombian politicians
21st-century Colombian politicians